Guillermo Carlos Morigi (born March 1, 1974) is an Argentine former professional football left winger who played for Vélez Sársfield in the Primera División Argentina throughout most of his career. He was part of the team during its most successful years, the 1990s.

Club career
Morigi was born in Caseros, Buenos Aires province. He started his career with Vélez Sársfield of the Argentine First Division. He was part of the first team in the history of the club to achieve two consecutive championships, the Apertura and Clausura of the 1995–96 season. He also won with the team the 1996 Supercopa Sudamericana and 1997 Recopa Sudamericana.

For the 1997–98 season Morigi was sold to Spanish La Liga side Valencia CF. However, as most of Vélez Sársfield's 1990s multi champions, he was not successful outside his first team. He played 15 games for Valencia and scored 1 goal, in a 4–3 victory over FC Barcelona. He was also part of the squad that won the 1998 UEFA Intertoto Cup, and played some minutes in the first final against Austria Salzburg. Morigi was also part of the squad that won de 1998–99 Copa del Rey, having played for the club during the first half of the season-long championship.

He returned to Vélez in 1999 and played for the team until 2002. He then had a short spell at Racing and Ecuadorian Barcelona SC, where he suffered a serious knee injury. He was released from his contract in 2004, and immediately retired at the age of 30.

International career
Morigi played a friendly match for the Argentina national team in 1996, while he was playing for Vélez.

Post-playing career
In 2008 Morigi won a trial against Barcelona SC for unpaid salary. Ecuadorian justice put an embargo on the team's stadium, the Estadio Monumental Banco Pichincha, to secure payment. He then went on to work as a football agent with the New Player Agent Corp.

Honours
Vélez Sársfield
 Argentine Primera División: Apertura 1995, Clausura 1996
 Supercopa Sudamericana: 1996
 Recopa Sudamericana:  1997

Valencia
 UEFA Intertoto Cup: 1998
 Copa del Rey: 1998–99

References

External links
 
  Argentine Primera statistics at Fútbol XXI
  Career statistics at BDFA
  Valencia CF statistics at Histoche

Living people
1974 births
Sportspeople from Buenos Aires Province
Association football wingers
Argentine footballers
Argentina international footballers
Argentine expatriate footballers
Club Atlético Vélez Sarsfield footballers
Valencia CF players
Racing Club de Avellaneda footballers
Barcelona S.C. footballers
Argentine Primera División players
La Liga players
Expatriate footballers in Spain
Expatriate footballers in Ecuador
Argentine expatriate sportspeople in Spain